Anno 1800 is a city-building real-time strategy video game, developed by Blue Byte and published by Ubisoft, and launched on April 16, 2019. It is the seventh game in the Anno series, and returns to the use of a historical setting following the last two titles, Anno 2070 and Anno 2205, taking place during the Industrial Revolution in the 19th century. Following the previous installment, the game returns to the series' traditional city-building and ocean combat mechanics, but introduces new aspects of gameplay, such as tourism, blueprinting, and the effects of industrialisation influences on island inhabitants.

Overview 
Anno 1800 takes place in the 19th century at the dawn of the Industrial Age. Like other Anno games, Anno 1800 is a city-building and strategy game. While it is set in the context of colonial trade, the featured architecture is Victorian Era and the economic engine is factory labor. The core gameplay of Anno 1800 takes place in the Old World, where the needs of the citizens, workers and artisans are central to the management of production and supply chains. A parallel New World city exists, which produces products that laborers in the Old World want to purchase, thus trade routes need to be established. Unlike its colonial 18th century predecessor Anno 1701, the game has a blueprint feature that helps the player to plan out the city.

The game also features a story campaign, a sandbox mode, and multiplayer mode. Like Anno 2205, the game features multisession gameplay, though unlike its predecessor, combat and city-building sessions are not separated. Anno 1800 integrates into a classic city-building game featuring randomly generated maps and trade routes, artificial intelligence (AI) opponents that build on the same map as the player, and naval warfare. 

The attractiveness rating of Anno 1800 grapples with the impact of industrialization on the population. With every factory the city's attractiveness rating falls and the rating of the area around an emerging industrial zone is also affected. Tourists contribute to the city's income and will flock to natural land, local festivities, and various decorative ornaments, but dislike pollution, local unrest, and noisy or smelly industry.

The blueprint mode of Anno 1800 is one of the new additions to the series. It helps the player by allowing them to plan out their city with silhouetted blueprint buildings, without immediately spending valuable resources on actually constructing them. If a player has insufficient resources the blueprint building can be placed on the city map for later construction. Once planning is done and the necessary resources are gathered, each blueprint building can be built with a single click.

Downloadable content 
The Anno 1800 Season 1 pass for paid-for downloadable content (DLC) includes the three DLC packs Sunken Treasure, Botanica and The Passage. While in Botanica cities can be beautified to attract more tourists, The Passage allows the player to sail the Northwest Passage on the way to the Arctic Circle. Sunken Treasure offers a new map with a huge island on which the player can build a gigantic city, and special items to boost their industry to sustain that city. 

In 2020, Season 2 introduced a further three DLC packs. Seat of Power lets the player choose which policies will influence the settlements in the vicinity of a palace. The Bright Harvest DLC introduces tractors and workforce reduction. In Land of Lions the player is challenged with exploring a desert, navigate social class and build an irrigation system to counter water shortage. 

In 2021, Season 3 introduced three more DLCs. Docklands allows the player to turn their city into a global trade hub with a modular warehouse system and use trade contracts to create a monopoly on player's favorite goods. Tourist Season introduces the new Tourist resident tier to city’s hotels and keep them entertained with restaurants and bus tours of hotspots. The High Life implements the construction of the first skyscrapers helping keep investors happy with shopping malls and the construction of the game’s biggest monument, the Empire Building.

In 2022, Season 4 saw the release of a further three DLCs. These DLCs focused more on the New World, introducing haciendas and other game mechanics. In addition, these three DLCs each came with their own custom scenario, each containing new challenges and unique gameplay experiences. The three DLCs included in Season 4 are Seeds of Change, Empire of the Skies, and New World Rising.

Distribution 
Anno 1800 is available on Steam, Epic Games Store, Origin, and Ubisoft Connect. It was originally also available for pre-purchase on Steam, but was pulled from Steam when it officially launched. In December 2022, Anno 1800 was reinstated on Steam.

Reception

The game received "generally favorable" reviews according to review aggregator Metacritic. The title became the fastest-selling Anno game, selling four times more copies than Anno 2205 achieved during its first week of release.

Awards

References

External links 

 

Anno (series)
Strategy games
City-building games
Real-time strategy video games
Science fiction video games
Ubisoft games
Windows games
Windows-only games
Video games about robots
Video games developed in Germany
Video games set in the 19th century
Video games set in the Arctic
Blue Byte games
2019 video games
Multiplayer and single-player video games